Rodrigo Javier Delgado Mocarquer (La Ligua, June 13, 1974) is a Chilean psychologist and politician, member of the Independent Democrat Union (UDI) party. From November 4, 2020 until 11 March 2022, he served as Minister of the Interior and Public Security of Chile, under the second administration of Sebastián Piñera.

Previously, between 2008 and 2020, he was mayor of the Estación Central commune.

Biography

Personal life 
Son of Jorge Delgado Toro Mazote and Eliana Mocarquer Mucarquer, he lived his childhood with his family in La Ligua, in the Valparaíso region. His mother is a descendant of Palestinian immigrants living in Chile.

Since October 19, 2014, he has been married to Nicole Nef, daughter of former soccer player Adolfo Nef. The couple has 3 children; Mariano and María Gracia (twins) and a third.

Studies and professional career 
He attended high school at the Arab School of Santiago, and studied psychology at Andrés Bello National University, graduating as a psychologist in 1999. He also has certifications in Corporate Social Responsibility from the University of Chile, and certifications in Excellence in Municipal Services and Management of Local Governments from the University for Development (UDD).

He practiced psychology at the Option Youth Center of Cerro Navia. Later he worked at the Lampa Youth Center.

In 2000 he became director of Community Development of the Municipality of Estacion Central, under mayor Gustavo Hasbún, where he remained for eight years.

Political career 
He was elected mayor of Estación Central, part of Greater Santiago, in the 2008 municipal elections for the 2008–2012 period. He was reelected in the municipal elections of 2012 and 2016, serving three terms in total, for which he was unable to seek reelection for a fourth term after the entry into force of Law 21,238. Since 2019 he was vice president of the Chilean Association of Municipalities (AMUCh), and in April 2020, he became president of the association, succeeding José Miguel Arellano, mayor of Padre Hurtado.

On November 4, 2020, he resigned as mayor of Estación Central, so he could become the Minister of the Interior and Public Security in the second government of President Sebastián Piñera, after the resignation of Víctor Pérez Varela from that position the day before.

At the end of 2020, he was invited by the Ministry of Health (Minsal) to join the COVID-19 task force.

Controversies 
During his tenure, the Municipality of Estación Central granted building permits to the real estate company Placilla SpA, which were declared illegal by the Constitutional Court, since they contravene the regulations of the Ministry of Housing and Urbanism that make "continuous building" impossible in an area that has no height limit.

Election history

Municipal elections of 2008 

 2008 municipal elections for mayor of Estacion Central

2012 municipal elections 

 2012 municipal elections for mayor of Estacion Central

2016 municipal elections 

 2016 municipal elections for mayor of Estacion Central

References 

Living people
Chilean Ministers of the Interior
1974 births
Andrés Bello National University alumni
University for Development alumni
University of Chile alumni
Independent Democratic Union politicians